The Theatre Surjya  is a new mobile theatre group of the North-Eastern Indian state of Assam, founded by Munindra Barman in 2015. It was launched in a big way in 2015-16 season. The main actors which were signed for the 2015-16 season are Tapan Das, Chinmoy Kotoky, Rajkumar, Devismita and Bhranti Medhi. For 2016-17 season famous actor Jatin Bora was signed by the theatre. In 2022-23, Moi Sendur Nolow is one of the most popular drama with lead actress Debashree Das.

List of Plays

External links
 Facebook page of Theatre Surjya
 Promo of Theatre Surjya

Theatre companies in India
Organisations based in Assam
Culture of Assam
2015 establishments in Assam
Organizations established in 2015